Paris in Motion is a photographic project about the city of Paris. It contains a series of three videos made only of photographs (more than 30,000 photos).

Parts
Paris in Motion is in 3 parts (Videos featured on Vimeo and YouTube).
 2012: Paris in Motion (Part I) – 3000 photographs selected
 2012: Paris in Motion (Part II) – 3500 photographs selected
 2013: Paris in Motion (Part III) – 5500 photographs selected
 2014: Paris in Motion (part IV) 
 2014: Paris in Motion (part V)

References

External links
The project on Behance

Photography by genre